Qantara    is a village in Akkar Governorate, Lebanon.

The population  is mostly Sunni Muslim  and Maronites.

History
In 1838, Eli Smith noted  the place as el-Kantarah,  located west of esh-Sheikh Mohammed. The  inhabitants were Maronites.

References

Bibliography

External links
Qantara, Localiban 

Populated places in Akkar District
Sunni Muslim communities in Lebanon
Maronite Christian communities in Lebanon